Soga may refer to:

People 
 Soga clan, a Japanese clan of the Yamato period
 Soga clan (Sagami Province), a Japanese clan
 Soga people, of the Busoga kingdom in present-day Uganda
 Machiko Soga, Japanese voice actress
 Soga Tokimune, Japanese samurai
 Soga Sukenari, Japanese samurai

Places 
 Soga (river), a tributary of the Sogozha in Poshekhonye District, Yaroslavl Oblast, Russia
 Soga, Tanzania, a railway station in Tanzania
 Soga, an island in the Bissagos Islands off the coast of Guinea-Bissau
 Soga Station, a railway station in Japan

Other 
 Soga language, a Bantu language spoken in Uganda and the native language of the Soga people
 Soga Monogatari, a Japanese tale of the Soga brothers
 Sale of Goods Act (SOGA), legislation in the United Kingdom relating to the sale of goods
 Soga, a percussion instrument

See also 
 Busoga, a traditional Bantu kingdom and one of five constitutional monarchies in present-day Uganda

Japanese-language surnames